The 2008 ANZ Championship season was the inaugural season of the ANZ Championship. The 2008 season began on 5 April and concluded on 28 July. Waikato Bay of Plenty Magic were minor premiers after finishing top of the table following the regular season. New South Wales Swifts, with a team coached by Julie Fitzgerald and captained by Catherine Cox, won 10 of their 13 matches and finished second behind Magic. Swifts subsequently defeated Magic in both the major semi–final and the grand final to become the inaugural ANZ Championship winners. The grand final was played on 28 July at Acer Arena. Overall, 6792 goals were scored during the season, averaging 98.44 per match. Fox Sports (Australia) and Sky Sport (New Zealand) attracted an average audience per match of 56,581.

Transfers

Head coaches and captains

Regular season
During the regular season the Australian teams played each other twice and the New Zealand teams once. The New Zealand teams also played each other twice and each of the Australian teams once.

Round 1

Round 2

Round 3

Round 4

Round 5

Round 6

Round 7

Round 8

Round 9

Round 10

Round 11

Round 12

Round 13

Round 14

Final table

Playoffs

Major semi-final

Minor semi-final

Preliminary final

Grand final

Award winners

ANZ Championship awards

Notes
  Romelda Aiken and Sonia Mkoloma shared the MVP Award

Australian Netball Awards

References

 
2008
2008 in New Zealand netball
2008 in Australian netball